Lancashire County Lunatic Asylum and Lancashire County Asylum are historical names for:

 The first  Lancashire County Lunatic Asylum, Lancaster Moor Hospital
 The second, Prestwich Hospital
 The third, Rainhill Hospital
 The fourth, Whittingham Hospital
 The fifth, Winwick Hospital, in Winwick, Cheshire (formerly Lancashire)
 The sixth, Calderstones Hospital near Whalley